Fun People was a hardcore band from Argentina. Their lyrics were in English and Spanish, often mixing both languages in a single song or even line. Human and animal rights are frequent subjects in their lyrics. The band mixes punk music with other genres such as reggae, pop, tango, thrash metal and others.

As the band became well known, skinheads who enjoyed the band's aggressive music in a violent way started to show up at concerts, prompting singer Nekro to call the band's genre "anti-fascist gay hardcore" in an attempt to get rid of those fans. For this reason Fun People is sometimes confused as queercore.

History
Early on, the band was called Anesthesia (as a tribute to Cliff Burton). When the band was about to release their first album, planned to be self-titled, they found out someone else had already copyrighted Anesthesia as a band name. Fun People, the name of a fanzine Nekro made and sold at the band's concerts, was chosen as the band's new name and Anesthesia remained as the album's title.

Fun People was a famous band, under which was left to be, or a half-under, which at its inception had been within the Hardcore / Punk, with an occasional tendency to Grindcore, but also owns a sometimes melodic Hardcore (Play "Anesthesia", her first album). Now in its second plate turned into a great combo as versatile as effective and convincing, to include issues of Trash Metal, Ska, Pop song sixty to 100% (the classic "Chew"), Reggae, Rock to dry (e.g.: Pilar, Poorman), turning a little closer to power pop, always within the framework of Punk, "Kum-Kum" is a lightning-fast turning point in his career. The third album by Fun People are more raw, more hardcore, without losing the good and catchy melodies, including a beautiful ballad ("Point Of Lovely Sun"), a very delicate folk song ("Rainbow"), and a cover Frontal Attack, a track as fast as direct ("I am not part of this!") and closes with a song that was part of their first demo, still under the name "Anesthesia." The fourth album from long-term study is "The Art (e) of Romance", recorded and produced by Steve Albini, famous for his work with the likes of Page / Plant, Nirvana and The Pixies, recorded entirely in United States is a very eclectic album (which now standard at this point) with a photo on the cover of Kurt Gustav Wilckens, the Vindicator, with super powerful and super fast tracks, themes Punk Rock, Rock, or simply as "Middle of the Rounds", a sad and tragic ballad about the letter and "Leave Me Alone", a bit of Trash ("One Day (Like Wilckens)"), more trash ...("¿Where Are You?"), a topic with very good effects console flirting with electronics ("December") and closes with a theme a capella that reminds some commercial era of post-war 50's in America (with a little imagination, of course) . The latest album under the name of Fun People was titled "Sorrow, No, No", and is, as is described by the singer at the time, a "return to roots", a disc with almost more minutes on their topics have, super fast, furious, almost no time to breathe when you hear it, the truth is it is a good bounce, a more shrill and less Nekro Tyrol, and now has almost the same training to accompany the singer on stage soloist (the same lineup except for Gori, who had joined FP in the year 98 after the departure of Lucas) on this album, just with an a cappella singing Tanguito Nekro. The band apart from having in his repertoire album with studio albums, has several simple and published EP ("The Fun People Experience"), which marks the debut of Gori on an album of the band, and the difference is, Gori's style is more rock, with peanuts and worthy of a rock licks of law and good arrangements, Lucas instead had a more raw sound and saturated, Heavy if you will. In those rare-but very abundant at a time-5 years (1995-2000) of life, Fun People released 5 studio albums, a disc with demos and excerpts from concerts (one radial acoustic and electric in the city of Chicago) and with the inclusion of 2 covers, a couple of singles, a 6-song EP and an album with all acoustic versions of "golden hits" from the band ("Gori & Nekro - Golden Hits") "This is very unlikely, since the band never had" golden hits "on commercial terms and / or mass-media, and editing a home video of a concert of the band in their beginnings in the theater Harlequins , 1995 year entitled "When the sun sets".

They performed for the last time in a surprise show (that was not announced in the media) for many fans that found out about this gig through internet and other means, approx. 9 years ago.

They remain widely admired by people in the Hardcore music scene, despite being criticized by many other HC bands for their general anti macho attitude, so common in the scene .

Aftermath and reunions

Jhonathan Scarcha leaves the band again and Nekro gets fully involved in his new soloist project: Boom Boom Kid. Pelado and Chelo accompany him until nowadays. Lucas Sequeira fronts Cucsifae since his departure from Fun People in 97. Gori now fronts Fantasmagoria. Chuli played for a while in Satan Dealers while Gato is currently playing in a Spanish Band called Phogo.
Fun People got reunited in three different occasions, although they never announce themselves officially, letting people learn about the reunion by word of mouth. The first reunion was in 2003, at Trivenchi Shed. The line-up consisted of Nekro, Gori, Jhonathan, Pelado and Chelo. They played twice in the same night due to the great call. The second reunion was in 2005, the gig was announced as a Boom Boom Kid show but Gori showed up and they reviewed songs of their old band. Finally, their last reunion was in 2010. According to Nekro, he was planning to do something with Gori when they decided spontaneously to go on a summer tour. The band is temporarily inactive.

Line-up

Last Line-up 
 Carlos Damián Rodriguez (Nekro a.k.a. Boom Boom Kid) — lead vocals (1989–2001, 2003, 2005, 2010, 2013)
 Carlos Loncharich (Gori) — guitars (1997–2000, 2003, 2005, 2010, 2013)
 Dario Lopez (Pelado) — bass (1999–2001, 2003, 2005, 2010, 2013)
 Marcelo Vidal (Chelo) — drums (1999–2001, 2003, 2005, 2010, 2013)

Past members 
 Cape-guitars (1989-1991)
 Jhonathan Scarcha — guitars (1991–1995, 2001, 2003)
 Lucas Sequeira — guitars (1995–1997)
 Gus Pepa — bass (1989–1993)
 Julián Pugliese (Chuli) — bass (1993–1999)
 Blacky — drums (1989–1995)
 Sebastián Garay (Gato) — drums (1995–1999)

Discography

Studio albums
 1995 – Anesthesia
 1996 – Desarme!
 1996 – Kum-Kum
 1997 – Toda Niño Sensible Sabrá De Que Estamos Hablando
 1998 – The Fun People Experience
 1999 – The Art(e) Of Romance
 1999 – Gori & Nekro – Golden Hits (Acoustic)
 2000 – Angustia, No, No
 2000 – El Aborto Illegal Asesina Mi Libertad (7" Split with the Argentinian punk rock band She-Devils; this recording had been previously released in tape format in the mid 1990s)

Compilation albums
 1998 – Adios, Adios, Dust Bunnies
 2003 – Otros Callan

Live albums
 1995 – Arlequines 23-09-95
 1997 – Pinguilandia (bootleg)
 1998 – Cemento 06-12-98 (bootleg)
 1999 – Cemento 27-03-99 (bootleg)
 1999 – Ramos Mejía 19-03-99 (bootleg)

See also
Argentine punk

External links
Fun People website (Spanish)

Argentine hardcore punk groups
Feminism in Argentina